Posyolok imeni Krasina is a rural locality (a settlement) in Vakhromeyevskoye Rural Settlement, Kameshkovsky District, Vladimir Oblast, Russia. The population was 351 as of 2010. There are 4 streets.

Geography 
The settlement is located on the Seksha River, 16 km north of Kameshkovo (the district's administrative centre) by road. Tyntsy is the nearest rural locality.

References 

Rural localities in Kameshkovsky District